Cnephasia gueneeana is a moth of the family Tortricidae. It was described by Philogène Auguste Joseph Duponchel in 1836. In Europe, it has been recorded from Great Britain, France, Italy and Greece. The species is native to the Mediterranean sub-region, ranging from Palestine and southern Europe to Morocco and the Canary Islands.

The wingspan is 15–21 mm. Adults are on wing from March to June.

The larvae feed on Senecio and Oxalis species.

References

 "Cnephasia gueneeana (Duponchel, 1836)". Insecta.pro. Retrieved February 5, 2020.

Moths described in 1836
gueneeana
Moths of Europe